Leon Ross Nikoro Davies (born 22 November 1999) is an English footballer who plays as a defender for National League South club Braintree Town. He attended Impington Village College from 2011 to 2016.

Career
Davies was a Cambridge United youth graduate and earned himself a professional contract with Cambridge United . He made his first team debut on 30 August 2016 in a 1–0 EFL Trophy win against Shrewsbury Town. He made his League Two debut on 2 January 2017 coming on a substitute in a 4–0 win against Notts County.

On 18 January 2019, Davies joined National League South side Bath City on loan for a month. He was offered a new contract by Cambridge United at the end of the 2018–19 season. During the off season Davies signed a new two-year contract with Cambridge keepon him at the club until the summer of 2021.

On 29 November 2021, Davies joined National League side Weymouth on a one-month loan deal.

On 11 January 2022, Davies joined National League side Southend United on a permanent deal until summer 2022. 

On 15 July 2022, Davies agreed to join fellow Essex-based side, Braintree Town ahead of the 2022–23 campaign.

Career statistics

References

External links

English footballers
Living people
Cambridge United F.C. players
Bath City F.C. players
Weymouth F.C. players
Southend United F.C. players
Braintree Town F.C. players
English Football League players
National League (English football) players
1999 births
Association football defenders
Sportspeople from Cambridge